Glycemia means the presence, or the level, of glucose in one's blood.  Related words include:
 Hyperglycemia, an unusually high concentration of glucose in the blood
 Hypoglycemia, an unusually low concentration of glucose in the blood